Amphipoles, in antiquity, were archons, or chief magistrates, of the city of Syracuse. They were first established by Timoleon, after his expulsion of Dionysius the Elder, tyrant of Syracuse. They governed Syracuse for a space of three hundred years, and Diodorus Siculus wrote that they subsisted even in his time (c. 90 BC to c. 30 BC).

Sources

Ancient Greek titles